Amy Marie Yasbeck (born September 12, 1962) is an American actress. She is best known for her role as Casey Chappel Davenport on the sitcom Wings from 1994 to 1997, and for having played the mermaid Madison in the television film Splash, Too in 1988 (the role originated by Daryl Hannah in the film Splash). She has guest starred in several television shows and appeared in the films House II: The Second Story, Pretty Woman, Problem Child, Problem Child 2, The Mask, Robin Hood: Men in Tights, and Dracula: Dead and Loving It.

Early life
Yasbeck was born in the Cincinnati suburb of Blue Ash, Ohio, the daughter of Dorothy Louise Mary (née Murphy), a homemaker, and John Anthony Yasbeck, a butcher and grocery store owner. Her father was of Lebanese descent, while her mother was of Irish ancestry. As a child, Yasbeck was featured on the package art for the Betty Crocker Easy-Bake Oven. Years later, in 2000, she was presented with a new Easy-Bake Oven on the show I've Got a Secret, for which she was a regular panel member.

She spent her primary and secondary years at two different Catholic schools: Summit Country Day School and Ursuline Academy. She then enrolled in the theater program at the University of Detroit, but didn't graduate. In 1983, after the deaths of both of her parents, her father from a heart attack and her mother from emphysema, Yasbeck moved to New York City.

Career
Early into her acting career, she appeared in Rockhopper, an unsold CBS television pilot from 1985. Yasbeck has had guest-starring roles in many television shows, including Dallas, Spies, Werewolf, J.J. Starbuck, Magnum, P.I., China Beach, and Murphy Brown. She auditioned for the role of Elaine Benes on Seinfeld. She played Olivia Reed for four months between 1986 and 1987 on the long-running daytime soap opera Days of Our Lives. She also played the starring role of the mermaid Madison in the Disney television movie Splash, Too in 1988 (the role of Madison was originated by Daryl Hannah in the 1984 movie Splash). Playing a mermaid in Splash, Too was a fulfillment of a childhood dream for Yasbeck, as she loved mermaids when she was  5 years old after watching a Disney movie that featured mermaids. Yasbeck has also had starring roles in the sitcoms Wings, Alright Already, and Life on a Stick and in movies such as House II: The Second Story, Pretty Woman, Problem Child, Problem Child 2, and The Mask. She has twice worked with Mel Brooks, in 1993's Robin Hood: Men in Tights and 1995's Dracula: Dead and Loving It.

Yasbeck also appeared once on the hit DCOS That's So Raven as the mother of one of the main characters, Chelsea. The episode originally aired on September 22, 2006.

In late 2007, plans surfaced of a potential That's So Raven spin-off featuring Yasbeck and Anneliese van der Pol, who portrayed her daughter, with occasional appearances by Raven-Symoné. The show was scrapped due to van der Pol signing onto a new Broadway play, and Yasbeck wanting to take a break from acting to focus on her family.

She was a contestant on the syndicated version of Are You Smarter than a 5th Grader? in 2010.

Personal life

Yasbeck is the widow of actor John Ritter, with whom she had worked in several projects. She first met him at director Dennis Dugan's house during a read-through of their 1990 movie Problem Child.

Yasbeck and Ritter also starred together in Problem Child 2 (1991) and guest-starred together in an episode of The Cosby Show which aired in 1991. Ritter also guest-starred on Wings as Yasbeck's estranged husband in the season-seven episode "Love Overboard". The couple had a child together in 1998, and they married the following year on September 18, 1999, at the Murphy Theatre in Wilmington, Ohio.

On September 11, 2003, Ritter fell into a coma when rehearsing for 8 Simple Rules for Dating My Teenage Daughter. He was taken to the hospital by paramedics. Initially, Ritter was thought to be suffering a heart attack. At 10:48 that night, Ritter died. The cause of death was actually an aortic dissection stemming from a previously undiagnosed congenital heart defect.

Yasbeck gave her blessing to the continuation of the sitcom, as 8 Simple Rules, where it was ultimately decided that Katey Sagal's character would assume the lead role as a widow.

Yasbeck appeared on Larry King Live on June 16, 2008, to discuss heart disease.

On the September 5, 1990, episode of The Tonight Show Starring Johnny Carson, she said that her "great-great-great uncle" Charles Webb Murphy was the owner of the Chicago Cubs during their championships of the early 1900s.

Wrongful death lawsuit
After her husband John Ritter died, Yasbeck filed a $67 million wrongful death lawsuit against Providence Saint Joseph Medical Center and several doctors who treated him, alleging they misdiagnosed his condition and that contributed to his death. Several of the defendants settled out of court for a total of $14 million, including Providence St. Joseph, which settled for $9.4 million. On March 14, 2008, a jury split 9–3 in favor of the doctors, clearing the physicians of any wrongdoing.

Filmography

Film

Television

Books

References

External links
 
 
 

1962 births
Actresses from Cincinnati
American film actresses
American soap opera actresses
American television actresses
American people of Arab descent
American people of Lebanese descent
American people of Irish descent
Living people
University of Detroit Mercy alumni
20th-century American actresses
21st-century American actresses
People from Blue Ash, Ohio